Gábor Józsa (born 18 August 1983) is a Hungarian long distance runner. He finished 87th in the marathon at the 2016 Summer Olympics. In 1998 Józsa took up orienteering, and became an international competitor in this sport. He changed to athletics in 2002. He works in the information technology field.

References

External links

 
 
 
 
 

1983 births
Living people
Hungarian male long-distance runners
Hungarian male marathon runners
Place of birth missing (living people)
Athletes (track and field) at the 2016 Summer Olympics
Olympic athletes of Hungary
21st-century Hungarian people